José Rafael Nadal Power (born December 8, 1973) is a Puerto Rican politician from the Popular Democratic Party (PPD). Nadal Power was elected to the Senate of Puerto Rico in 2012.

Early years and studies

José Rafael Nadal Power was born in the district of Santurce, in San Juan on December 8, 1973. He studied his elementary and secondary studies in Santurce.

In 1996, Nadal Power received his bachelor's degree in political science from the University of Puerto Rico at Río Piedras. In 1999, he completed a Juris doctor from the University of Puerto Rico School of Law. The following year, he passed the bar exam, which allowed him to practice law in the island. That same year, he was admitted with a scholarship from the International and Iberoameric Foundation of Administration and Public Policy to study a master's degree in applied political studies in Madrid, Spain. He completed that degree in 2001

Professional career

Once he obtained his degree, Nadal Power began working for then-mayor of San Juan, Sila Calderón. He then worked as a legislative aide for Resident Commissioner Aníbal Acevedo Vilá in Washington, D.C. When Acevedo Vilá became Governor of Puerto Rico in 2004, Nadal Power was appointed as advisor in municipal affairs and public policy. After two years, Nadal Power started working as an attorney in corporate law, specializing in government employment, ethics, consumer protection, and others.

Political career

Nadal Power decided to run for a seat in the Senate of Puerto Rico under the Popular Democratic Party (PPD). After winning a spot on the 2012 primaries, he was elected on the general elections to represent the District of San Juan.

See also
25th Senate of Puerto Rico

References
 José Nadal Power Biography

Living people
Members of the Senate of Puerto Rico
1973 births
Democratic Party (Puerto Rico) politicians
University of Puerto Rico alumni